Joseph Anthony Gatto Jr. (born June 5, 1976) is an American improvisational comedian, actor, and producer from the New York City borough of Staten Island. He was a member of the Tenderloins, a comedy troupe consisting of Sal Vulcano, James Murray, and Brian Quinn. Along with the other members of the Tenderloins, he starred in the television series Impractical Jokers, which first aired on December 15, 2011, on TruTV.

Early life 
Gatto was born in Staten Island and is of Italian descent. Gatto attended Monsignor Farrell High School. Along with Murray, Vulcano, and Quinn, he was a member of his high school's Improvisation Club. He studied at LIU Post, where he received a degree in accounting. Gatto's father died in 1995 from pancreatic cancer. In the past, his father's death had been popularly attributed to alcoholism, though Gatto later pronounced this claim false.

Career

Early career 
After being apart for years, Murray, Gatto, and Vulcano reunited after graduating from college and began practicing improvisation at Gatto's house, going on to tour as an improv and sketch comedy troupe in 1998, calling themselves the Tenderloins.

The Tenderloins began producing comedy sketches together, posting them on YouTube, Myspace, and Metacafe, accumulating millions of views online. In 2007, the troupe won the $100,000 grand prize in the NBC It's Your Show competition for the sketch "Time Thugs".

Impractical Jokers and other television shows 
Impractical Jokers premiered on December 15, 2011 on TruTV. The first season was watched by over 32 million viewers. The show quickly became the most popular series on TruTV and has boosted Gatto into the public eye.

In 2019, Gatto, along with the other members of the Tenderloins, starred in The Misery Index, which is hosted by Jameela Jamil and is based on Andy Breckman's card game "Shit Happens".

Impractical Jokers: The Movie was released on February 21, 2020.

On December 31, 2021, Gatto announced he was stepping away from Impractical Jokers and the Tenderloins to focus more on co-parenting his children, after a split with his wife.

The Tenderloins Podcast 
The Tenderloins began hosting a podcast in April 2012. It is available on their official website and on iTunes.

Personal life 
Gatto and his former wife, Bessy, have two children, daughter Milana (born 2015) and son Remington (born 2017). Gatto is an advocate for the "Adopt, Don't Shop" movement, encouraging people to adopt pets from shelters rather than purchase them from breeders.  They have had multiple dogs.

On December 31, 2021, Gatto announced that he was leaving the Impractical Jokers, and would be focusing on his family issues: "However, due to some issues in my personal life, I have to step away. Bessy and I have decided to amicably part ways, so now I need to focus on being the best father and co-parent to our two incredible kids."

Gatto actively campaigns against bullying, and his content dealing with the issue includes various YouTube segments.

Gatto is a Kentucky Colonel.

Gatto is teetotal, and this was evident in many episodes of Impractical Jokers.

References

External links 
 

1976 births
Living people
21st-century American comedians
American people of Italian descent
Comedians from New York City
LIU Post alumni
Monsignor Farrell High School alumni
People from Staten Island
The Tenderloins